Danger Route is a 1967 British spy film directed by Seth Holt for Amicus Productions and starring Richard Johnson as Jonas Wilde, Carol Lynley and Barbara Bouchet. It was based on Andrew York's 1966 novel The Eliminator that was the working title of the film.

The film was released in the United States as a double feature with Attack on the Iron Coast.

Plot
Jonas Wilde, a leading British secret agent/assassin, returns home to the Channel Islands from a mission in the Caribbean fearing his nerve has gone, and attempts to resign. He is persuaded by his superior, Tony Canning, to undergo a final mission and assassinate a defector being held by the Americans. Wilde starts a relationship with Jocelyn.

As part of the mission Wilde seduces Rhoda, a housekeeper at the house where the scientist is being kept, in order to access the house. He is captured and interrogated by CIA agent Lucinda who tells Wilde that someone is causing British agents to be killed by mistake.

Wilde escapes and goes looking for Canning, who has disappeared. He teams up with Canning's wife, Barbara, and heads to the base in the Channel Islands.

A fellow agent, Brian Stern, tells him that another member of their unit, Peter Ravenspur, has been murdered. Wilde and Stern then take Ravenspur's niece Mari aboard Stern's boat for questioning.

Stern reveals he is a double agent but is killed by Wilde. Mari, who has been working for Lucinda, is killed accidentally.

Wilde goes back to London and discovers that his girlfriend, Jocelyn, was working for Stern. Wilde kills her.

Canning tells Wilde that he is too valuable to be allowed to resign.

Cast
 Richard Johnson as Jonas Wilde 
 Carol Lynley as Jocelyn 
 Barbara Bouchet as Marita 
 Sylvia Syms as Barbara Canning 
 Gordon Jackson as Brian Stern 
 Diana Dors as Rhoda Gooderich 
 Maurice Denham as Peter Ravenspur 
 Sam Wanamaker as Lucinda 
 David Bauer as Bennett 
 Robin Bailey as Parsons 
 Harry Andrews as Tony Canning 
 Julian Chagrin as Matsys 
 Reg Lye as Balin 
 Leslie Sands as Man in Cinema 
 Timothy Bateson as Halliwell

Production
The film was an attempt to cash in on the popularity of James Bond movies. It was based on The Eliminator, a novel by Andrew York about an assassin, Jonas Wilde, who worked for "The Route", a small government organization based on the island of Jersey. It was published in 1966. The Observer called it "a fast moving spy story". "There isn't a human, living character in the book," said The Guardian. The New York Times said "the author has narrative viguour and a great deal of ingenuity in small details which is probably enough to outbalance his liberal use of plot cliches." The character appeared in a series of novels.

Film rights were bought by Amicus who in January 1967 announced they would make the movie from a script by Meade Roberts under the direction of Seth Holt. It would be the first of a three-picture deal with United Artists. In February Amicus said Richard Johnson would play the lead. Diana Dors played a support role.

Milton Subotsky of Amicus called the movie doomed, saying the director Seth Holt was ill during filming, the script never worked and the cameraman was replaced in the middle of the shoot. Box office response was poor. Subotsky later said this and What Became of Jack and Jill? were "total failures".

It was shot at Shepperton Studios with sets designed by the art director Don Mingaye.

At one stage the working title was People Who Make No Noise Are Dangerous.

Holt called the film  "dreadful. I scarcely saw it finished. I had a very 
difficult schedule. I was waiting between one and another and I needed the bread."

Reception
The Monthly Film Bulletin called it "a tired, and tiring muddle of a film with characters interestingly introduced and then abruptly dropped only to turn up later as though nothing has happened in the meantime."

The Guardian called it "a reasonably satisfying piece of work".

References

External links

Danger Route at TCMDB

Danger Route at BFI
Danger Route at Letterbox DVD

1967 films
British spy thriller films
1960s spy thriller films
Films directed by Seth Holt
Films set in London
Seafaring films
United Artists films
Amicus Productions films
Films based on British novels
Films set in the Channel Islands
Jersey in fiction
Films shot at Shepperton Studios
1960s English-language films
1960s British films